St James's Place is a street in the St James's district of London.

St James's Place or St. James Place may also refer to:

 St. James's Place plc, branded as St. James's Place Wealth Management, a British wealth management firm based in Cirencester, England
 St. James Place, the working title of the 2015 American film Bridge of Spies
 St. James Place, a property in the U.S. version of the board game Monopoly, named for a street in Atlantic City, New Jersey

See also
 St James's Place Festival Hunter Chase, a National Hunt steeplechase in the United Kingdom
 2000 St. James Place, an office building in Houston, Texas, in the United States
 St James's Palace, the most senior royal palace in the United Kingdom
 Saint James (disambiguation), a disambiguation page listing articles associated with that title